Tumhare Husn Ke Naam is a 2022 Pakistani drama serial. It is directed by Saqib Khan and written by Sara Qayyum. It stars Saba Qamar, Imran Abbas are in leading roles.

Cast 
 Saba Qamar as Salma
 Imran Abbas as Sikandar
 Sidra Niazi
 Asad Siddiqui as Atif
 Haris Waheed 
 Maha Hasan
 Nayyar Ejaz

References

Pakistani family television dramas
2020s Pakistani television series
2020s romantic drama television series
Pakistani romance television series